Flight 29 Down is an American adventure comedy-drama television series about a group of teenagers who are stranded on an island. It was produced by Discovery Kids. The show was created by Stan Rogow (Lizzie McGuire, Darcy's Wild Life) and D. J. MacHale (Are You Afraid of the Dark?, The Pendragon book series). The executive producers are Rogow, MacHale, Shauna Shapiro Jackson, and Gina & Rann Watumull.

The third and final season of the series was produced as a four-part film instead of the episodic format of the first two seasons. The film, Flight 29 Down: The Hotel Tango, aired in August 2007. In addition, the series was broadcast Saturday mornings on NBC as part of the Discovery Kids on NBC brand from 2005 to 2006.

The show was filmed on the island of Oahu in Hawaii.

Premise 
The show follows a group of teens stranded on a South Pacific island in the Federated States of Micronesia after they crash their plane (a De Havilland Heron) in a tropical storm while flying to an eco-adventure camping trip in Palau. A plot device of a video diary powered by a solar battery charger allows the kids to talk about themselves and to the camera about their difficult everyday struggles, the island, and each other. 

The series bore superficial similarities to Lost, an adult drama that debuted a year before Flight 29 Down, but Flight 29 Down never incorporated any supernatural elements as Lost eventually did. It also has many similarities with The New People and with Gordon Korman's Island trilogy.

Cast

Main cast 
 Allen Alvarado as Lex Marin
 Corbin Bleu as Nathan McHugh
 Hallee Hirsh as Daley Marin
 Jeremy Kissner as Eric McGorrill
 Johnny Pacar as Cody Jackson
 Lauren Storm as Taylor Hagan
 Kristy Wu as Melissa Wu

The "lost" cast 
 Tani Lynn Fujimoto as Abby Fujimoto
 B.K. Cannon as Jory Cavanaugh
 Blade Rogers as Ian Bedawan
 John Kapelos as Captain Bob Russell

Characters

Main characters

Lex Marin 
The youngest of the group and Daley's younger 10-year-old (turns 11) stepbrother who is intelligent, charismatic, and very observant, although the group constantly ignores him or put his ideas down, stating that "he's not old enough". He always comes up with the best ideas on how to adapt to the island and make use of its resources. He seems to be the motivation of the group. Whenever everyone else feels like quitting or giving up, Lex comes up with a brilliant idea to help everyone feel better. In the episode "Mazeathon", he creates an obstacle course. For Chilloween, he makes a shower that has warm water to make the island more like home. He has even made a shelter that lasted through many violent storms. As shown in several episodes, he misses the others from the plane and wants Abby to find them.
In Hotel Tango, Lex surprises everyone by saying it was Daley's fault the group separated and does not want to listen to her anymore.

Nathan McHugh 
In the first season Nathan brags about being a Boy Scout and thinks he should be the leader. This notion was also very much fueled by the competition he had with Daley. This was resolved by Jackson becoming the leader, and Daley and he end up as very good friends (perhaps even more). He is very close friends with Melissa and later on in the series develops a crush on Daley. Throughout a few seasons Nathan begins to think he is useless and no help to the others on the island. For example, he accidentally shoots down the signal kite when he is messing around with Lex and he also falls out of a tree trying to get coconuts. He regrets every other fault he made as well. He was portrayed as snobby in the novel, and wore rich people clothes, slip-on sneakers, converse low-tops, slip-on converse, and canvas Boat shoes is what he wears throughout the books, also he wore water shoes for when going in the water and getting to the raft. He cares very much for the sake of others. He strives to be helpful, though he lacks in self-confidence when he makes a mistake. He was very focused on getting out of the island, even risking his life to handle the radio, which could have attracted lightning and blown him up, in the middle of a dangerous lightning storm.

Daley Marin 
She's the recently elected class president of Hartwell High School, who beat Nathan by 10 votes. She's a hard worker and a bit of a perfectionist. Daley is Lex's stepsister (her father married Lex's mother about a year ago after her mother died), though this is never elaborated upon. Daley has developed a mutual crush on Nathan. Before which they would always fight. She, however, is much more secretive about this, confiding about it only to Melissa. Daley even kisses Nathan on the cheek once because he saves her from drowning. Daley finally tells Nathan she likes him. She wants to begin a relationship with him on the island. They do, however, agree to become a couple once everyone's off the island and back home safe again. Daley became the leader of the group (only after Jackson turned over the responsibility to her) and wants to handle situations in a civilized manner. The members don't always approve of her ways, though. She's too bossy, yells and wants things her way over the others. However, she tries to do the best she can. She's the hardest worker, and does not let herself rest. Nathan first described her as a "control freak" when the sore spot from the class president election was still raging. She likes to organize things. Due to her stubborn nature, she does not like to be told that she's wrong. She takes competition very seriously. Daley is resourceful, and does her best to maintain peace. She has a very strong relationship with her stepbrother, Lex, and defends him very well, like a real sister. She's fond of democracy and resolving matters through voting. This ultimately causes a divide in the group. Eric, Jackson and Melissa go to explore the west side of the island with Abby. Meanwhile, Nathan, Taylor, Lex and democratic Daley stay at the camp. In the novel, she's street smart and very strong-minded. She wears street clothes including Converse low-tops. She cheated in the elections and paid all 10 voters to vote for her.

Eric McGorrill 
He is more of a slacker and a comedian than anything else. He also tends to manipulate people to get out of various responsibilities and chores. Eric looks at other people's video diaries and announces their secrets to either one person or everyone. He hates lugging water, and caused the lighter to break leaving the group with no source of fire. However, he later fixes it. He wants to get off the island so he sneaks around taking miscellaneous objects. His actions are eventually discovered by Lex, who informs Melissa. Due to allergies he wasn't aware of, he becomes extremely ill after eating shellfish, nearly dying from an allergic reaction until Melissa gives him a shot which saves him. In the novel he's described as a class clown and acts like "the millionaire" from Gilligan's Island. He wears nice clothes, boat shoes, sperry top-siders and wears a straw fedora.

Cody Jackson 
Cody goes by his last name, Jackson and he's the antihero of the series. Cody is a 16-year-old male who generally keeps to himself. At school he was befriended by Melissa, who extended him the invitation to join the eco-camping trip. On the island, Cody gives help to the group when it's needed. In the first episode he befriends Lex, and Cody, unlike everyone else, actually listens to him. As a result, he's elected the leader of the stranded kids (a position which he reluctantly accepts) and maintains to keep the group civil. In the second season due to all the drama, he passed the responsibility of leadership to Daley. It's in this season that a love triangle develops between him, Melissa and Taylor. It began when he grew closer to a matured Taylor. Things changed, however, in the final moments of the series. It becomes apparent that he wants to get to know Melissa even more- in a sense 'chose' her. This whole time he's only gone by the name Jackson until the Flight 29 Down film; before they get saved, Melissa asks Jackson if Jackson was his first or last name. He replies, "It's Cody, Cody Jackson". He and Melissa become really close, and it's implied they will become romantically involved in the future.

Taylor Hagan 
Taylor comes onto the island thinking that being stranded was only temporary. Her life of being pampered and spoiled made her weaker than the others. However, soon she starts show some of her hidden talents. For example, she helps Jackson improve his fishing skills through small notes, then on one particular trek through the island, she discovers a trove of fruit and even gets the fire started when they're in need of it. She believes everyone in the group has a function, something that they're good at. It's because of this she comes to the realization that she's good at parties and having fun. She creates the holiday, Chilloween, which was featured in one of the episodes. In the first season, she proves that she hates being messed with and will go to great lengths to get revenge (revealing Melissa's video diary). A recurring problem in the second season is the relationship she and Jackson develop, much to the dismay of Melissa. By the end of the series, people recognize her as a more competent and genuine person. Throughout the series she becomes hard working and more aware of the others' feelings.

Melissa Wu 
Melissa has been best friends with Nathan since kindergarten. She's one of the only level-headed ones on the island. However, she tends to have an occasional habit of being overly hard on herself. She has a crush on Jackson, which Taylor reveals to everyone after Melissa accidentally ruins one of her shirts. She often tries to be everyone's friend, which causes her to lie in one episode. Melissa had a secret crush on Jackson when she wanted to be with him on the way back to school to talk to her friend. She tells her that she likes Jackson. At first Melissa doesn't like Abby, but in time her feelings change and they become friends. In Season Two she becomes distraught when Jackson and a matured Taylor grow closer. This problem is temporarily resolved as Taylor does not go west with Abby although Melissa, Jackson and Eric go.

The "Lost" Characters

Abby Fujimoto 
Abby is one of the smartest of all 9 of the high schoolers on the island. Throughout the show's progression she is the only "lost" character to be featured in more than 2 episodes and was the only one to survive the jungle alone with an injured leg. She also was the only character to brave the jungle alone and come back to the main campground on the beach several times. She was once thought by Melissa to have an attraction to Jackson. Abby shares a passion for music, as seen in one episode.
In "Abby Normal" she leaves the beach at night while all the 7 main characters are slowly dancing to "Be Strong" by Delta Goodrem.
In Season 2, she returns to the beach after a leg wound with a cold demeanor and a "survival of the fittest" outlook that frightens the others. Eventually she splits the cast in two in a quest to find life on the island. Though, in the finale, when they all are rescued, her normal "gentle" demeanor returns as she feels the gang have all been brought closer due to their experiences on the island.

Ian Milbauer 
Ian is a surfer from California that is always making smart comments. Ian is one of Abby's best friends on the island.

Jory Cavanaugh

Jory is friendly and quiet. She leaves the main group with Ian, Abby and Captain Russell and is not seen again until Hotel Tango.

Episodes

Series synopsis

First season 
A flight with ten teenagers and a pilot crashes on a tropical island after a storm results in an engine explosion. They all survive the crash. Three of the teenagers and the pilot leave to explore the island. The rest elect a leader and try to survive on their own. A huge monsoon ruins the camp and their communication equipment; however, brief contact with another plane had been established before the destruction.

Second season 
The group continue to survive but a storm left their camp in ruins, as well as their plane washed out to sea. One of the characters, Daley, is elected the new leader and she begins a democracy. The plane washes back on shore with a huge hole on its side. The survivors begin to learn that the island was involved in World War II when they find a time capsule from a general who once inhabited the island. They soon figure out there must be some life on the island.

Film 
"Flight 29 Down: The Hotel Tango" was released in 2007 as the series finale.
The castaways split into two groups. One stays on the beach, and one travels to find life on the island. Just when they think the place is deserted, they find an old concrete hotel used in WWII, along with other old buildings rotting away. They find the pilot, and the two other survivors in the hotel. The pilot has a bad sickness that makes him go crazy. In the end the castaways are saved by the Navy just before Typhoon Melissa hits the island and destroys everything.

Home releases 
All seasons have been released on DVD. The first season was released individually in 3 volumes, but later released on a first season package. Season 2 was released in one package and the series finale was released separate from the other DVDs.

In 2008, all the seasons have been released on DVD in Sweden by Pan Vision.

Book releases

Sequential releases

Special releases

Differences between the books and the series 
 In the episode "Groundbreaking", the castaways individually approach the box and imagine what would be in it, but in the book Scratch, the survivors have a meeting and explain what they thought the box was filled with.
 In the book Ten Rules, Lex's parents had a divorce, but in the film, he mentions that his dad died.
 The episode "Survival Of The Fittest" is before the episode "Mazeathon", but in the books, it's the other way around.
 The books have parts added to them that are not in the series.
 In the book Static, Melissa had the idea to have an election, but in the series, the kids all contributed to the idea.
 In the book Scratch, "Groundbreaking" is supposed to be first, but "He Said, She Said, He Said" is before that episode.
 In the books, the episodes "The Tide" and "Home Sweet Home" had been cut out in the storyline because they finished building Lex's shelter.
 In the book Static, Daley and Nathan go to the back of the plane to get the life raft; in the episode "Arrival", they do not.
 In the book Scratch, Melissa tells only Daley that Nathan likes her, not everybody at once.
 In the episode "Chilloween", Jackson plays "I Won't Stand Alone" but in the books he doesn't.
 In the book actions happen earlier or later it, is twisted
 In the episode "Mazeathon", Jackson wears converse low-tops, whereas in the book he wears sandals that blistered his feet, which had him running slower, so he took off the strap sandals to sprint barefoot as opposed to kicking off his chucks. 
 In Mazethon novel Nathan wore slip-on converse low-tops, while Jackson ran in bare feet.
 In the book a slight romance between Abby and Ian is mentioned, but in the series it is not.
 In the book, the stories of the "lost" kids are explored more than in the series.

Music 
Sam Winans composed most of the music of Flight 29 Down. Corbin Bleu, Nathan McHugh, sang "Circles" in the background in the episode, "He Said, She Said, He Said."

Broadcast 
The series aired on Discovery Kids and premiered in the United States on October 1, 2005. The final episode aired on August 25, 2007. After the series ended, reruns continued to air on The Hub until December 24, 2011.

The first season was aired on SVT (Sweden) during Summer 2006, as a part of the breakfast show Hej Hej sommar (Hello, Hello Summer). The second season aired in the same program during summer 2007, and started August 7. It has had reruns as part of the summer program "Sommarlov" both 2012 and 2013. The show aired in Finland (season 1 and season 2) during Summer 2006 as a part of the breakfast show Summeri. It is also aired on the Belgium channel Ketnet.

The show premiered in Portugal on September 17, 2011, the show airs in English with Portuguese subtitles on SIC.

The show premiered in Latin America, March 10, 2007, at 21:00 on Boomerang.

The show's first season also aired on TV3 Slovenia during the Summer of 2007. It is not known if TV3 Slovenia will air the second season or the film, The Hotel Tango.

The show premiered in Canada on Family on June 2, 2007, and on CHRGD on February 7, 2017.
The show also was aired in Saudi Arabia by MBC4

It was shown in Brazil by TV Cultura in 2008, from Monday to Friday, at 7 pm (Brasilia Time), under the title in Portuguese "Resgate Vôo 29" (Flight Rescue 29).

The first two seasons aired in Japan on NHK from June 2009 to March 2010. It was titled Totsuzen! Sabaibaru (Suddenly! Survival). The film was aired as season 3.

In Australia and New Zealand, the show was aired on Foxtel on the channel Nickelodeon every Saturday Night.

In Turkey, the show aired on TV8.

The show is available for streaming on Pure Flix and Tubi TV in the United States.

References

External links 

 
 

2000s American comedy-drama television series
2000s American teen drama television series
2005 American television series debuts
2007 American television series endings
American adventure television series
American educational television series
English-language television shows
Discovery Kids original programming
Serial drama television series
Television series about teenagers
Television shows about aviation accidents or incidents
Television series about being lost from home
Television series set on fictional islands
Television shows filmed in Hawaii